Nunivak Cup'ig or just Cup'ig (own name Cugtun) is a language or separate dialect of Central Alaskan Yup'ik spoken in Central Alaska at the Nunivak Island by Nunivak Cup'ig people (own name Cup'it or Nuniwarmiut). The letter "c" in the Yup’ik alphabet is equivalent to the English alphabet "ch".

The Central Alaskan Yupik who live on Nunivak Island (Nuniwar in Nunivak Cup'ig, Nunivaaq in Central Yup'ik) call themselves Cup'ig (plural Cup'it). Those who live in the village of Chevak call themselves Cup'ik (plural Cup'it). The name Cup'ig (with g) is used for the Nunivak Island Yup'ik dialect and the name Cup'ik (with k) is used for Hooper Bay-Chevak Yup'ik dialect.

The Cup'ig dialect is threatened. This fact was documented by Dr. Michael E. Krauss of the Alaska Native Language Center at the University of Alaska and is illustrated on the map. In 1975, Krauss indicated, "Some of the children speak the language". Krauss documented continued decline and downgraded the status to "Very few or none of the children speak the language" in 1982.

Today Cup'ig is spoken by elders in the village of Mekoryuk.

Classification 

Central Alaskan Yup'ik language
Norton Sound dialect is spoken Norton Sound region. Themselves Yup’ik
Unaliq subdialect by spoken Unalirmiut (= Atnegmiut, Kuuyuŋmiut, Eŋlutaleġmiut etc.) tribes.
Kotlik subdialect by spoken Pastulirmiut tribe
General Central Yup’ik dialect or Yugtun is spoken in Nelson Island, the Yukon, the Bristol Bay regions, and Kuskokwim. Themselves Yup’ik (Yukon) or Yupiaq (Kuskokwim).
Egegik Yupik is spoken Egegik and Egegik Bay. Themselves Yup’ik
Hooper Bay-Chevak Cup’ik is spoken Hooper Bay and Chevak areas. Themselves Cup’ik
Nunivak Cup'ig language or dialect is spoken Nunivak Island. Themselves Cup’ig

The comparison of number names in the three dialects

Grammatical numbers 
The grammatical numbers:

Education 
The Cup'ig peoples' only school, the Nuniwarmiut School (P/K-12th grade), lies within the Lower Kuskokwim School District, in the village of Mekoryuk. Built in 1984, the school provides English and Cup’ig bilingual education for 32 students.

Nuniwarmiut Piciryarata Tamaryalkuti, Inc.  (literally, "Nunivak Cultural Programs") is a non-profit cultural heritage organization of the Cup'ig Eskimo village of Mekoryuk, its mission being to preserve Nunivak Island Cup'ig culture, traditions, and language. NPT was established in 1999.

Example phrases 

Cangacit? - How are you?
Canritua - I am fine
Unuakukegci - Good morning
Agayunerpakegcikici - Have a very Merry Christmas
Allrakularakegciluci-llu - And have a Happy New Year
Taqukat, maklit neqkanka - Seals, bearded seals is my food
Quyana - Thanks
Quyana niicugnillua - Thank you for listening to me.
Quyana naqluki allnganka - Thank you for reading what I wrote.

Russian loanwords 
The Russian loanwords used in Nunivak Cup’ig date from the period of the Russian America (1733–1867).

caarralar (< Rus. сахар) 'sugar'
caayu  (< Rus. чай) 'tea'
caanig (< Rus. чайник) 'tea kettle'
cap’akir ( < Rus. сапоги) 'shoe'
cass’ar (< Rus. часы) 'clock'
culunar (?< Rus. солонина 'salted meat') 'salted fish'
kelipar (< Rus. хлеб) 'bread'
maslar (< Rus. масло) 'butter; margarine'
miss’ug (< Rus. мешок) 'burlap bag'
mulut’ug (< Rus. молоток) 'hammer'
paltug (< Rus. пальто) 'coat; jacket'
pelatekar (< Rus. палатка) 'tent'
putuskar (< Rus. подушка) 'pillow'
tiisiss’ar (< Rus. тысяча) 'thousand; one thousand dollars'
yaassig : (< Rus. ящик) 'box; cardboard box'

See also 
Chevak Cup’ik language
Alaska Native Language Center

References

External links 
On the Facebook: Nunivak Cup'ig Language page.
Nuniwarmiut Piciryarata Tamaryalkuti : Nunivak Island Cup'ig Language Preliminary Dictionary
 

Languages of the United States
Yupik languages
Endangered Eskaleut languages